Barkom-Kazhany  is a Ukrainian professional men's volleyball team, based in Lviv, playing in the Polish PlusLiga.

Achievements
 Ukrainian Super League
  (x4) 2018, 2019, 2020, 2021
  (x2) 2017, 2022
 Ukrainian Cup
  (x4) 2017, 2018, 2019, 2021
 Ukrainian Supercup
  (x4) 2016, 2018, 2019, 2020

Season by season

Team
As of 2022–23 season

Coaching staff

Players

Squad changes 2020/2021

In 
 Christian Thondike Mejías from  La Habana
 Anton Qafarena from  TV Bühl
 Jan Król from  VERVA Warszawa
 Yurii Semeniuk from  Maaseik
 Maksym Drozd from  Neftochimik Burgas
 Oleksandr Nalozhnyi from  Zhytychi Zhytomyr
 Vitalii Kucher from  MHP-Vinnytsia Trostianets

Out 
 Jan Król to  VERVA Warszawa
 Borys Zhukov to  Lakkapaa
 Yevhenii Kisiliuk to  Maribor
 Dmytro Shlomin to  Amber Volley
 Oleksandr Hladenko to  Příbram
 Yuriy Tomyn to  Epitsentr-Podoliany
 Vladyslav Bohatyrov to  Dnipro
 Oleksandr Tereshchuk

Notable players
Notable, former or current players of the club.
  Yurii Semeniuk

References

External links
Official website
Team profile at PlusLiga.pl 
Team profile at Volleybox.net

Ukrainian volleyball clubs
Sport in Lviv